Susana Thénon (Buenos Aires, 1935-1991) was an Argentine avant-garde poet, translator, and artistic photographer.

The daughter of the psychiatrist Jorge Thénon, she was a member of Argentina's Generación del ’60. Although she was a contemporary of Juana Bignozzi and Alejandra Pizarnik, Thenon was not part of any literary group. She affiliated within the marginal construction that works in her poetry, without adhering to any reigning movement.

Her relationship with other poets of her generation was minimal, with the exceptions of Maria Negroni, who later became one of the compilers in Thenon's posthumous books (La Morada Impossible I and II) and the aforementioned Pizarnik with which she frequented, and along with that published in the literary journal Agua Viva  (1960), which was perhaps one of the few signs of her openness to the poetic environment. A gap in her publications occurred between 1970 and 1982 when she was actively engaged in photography, although she continued to write during that period. Thenon also wrote some essays.

References

Bibliography

 Thénon, Susana. La Morada Imposible, Tomo I. Edición a cargo de Ana María Barrenechea y María Negroni. Buenos Aires, Corregidor, 2001. (in Spanish)
 Brief biography and poems by Susana Thénon
 La “quebrada geometría” de Edad sin tregua de Susana Thénon by Mariana Di Ció, Universidad Católica Argentina, Universidad de Paris IV - Sorbonne (in Spanish)

1935 births
1991 deaths
Argentine women poets
Argentine translators
Argentine women photographers
Argentine photographers
Fine art photographers
Writers from Buenos Aires
20th-century Argentine women writers
20th-century Argentine writers
20th-century Argentine poets
20th-century translators